Łężek may refer to the following places:
Łężek, Greater Poland Voivodeship (west-central Poland)
Łężek, Sławno County in West Pomeranian Voivodeship (north-west Poland)
Łężek, Świdwin County in West Pomeranian Voivodeship (north-west Poland)

See also
Discworld characters: Lezek is the innkeeper in Mort